The Dancers is a 1925 American silent drama film directed by Emmett J. Flynn and starring George O'Brien, Alma Rubens, and Madge Bellamy. It is an adaptation of the 1923 play The Dancers by Viola Tree and Gerald du Maurier. It was remade by Fox Film five years later as a sound film The Dancers.

Plot
As described in a review in a film magazine, Tony (O'Brien) and Una (Bellamy) are childhood sweethearts in England and vow to marry when they grow up. Tony leaves to make his fortune in South America and finally becomes the owner of a saloon and dance hall in Argentina. Tango dancer Maxine (Rubens), who works in the dance hall, falls in love with him, and he is attracted to her, but the memory of his childhood sweetheart is always before him and he remains true to her. Una grows up as a devotee of jazz and wild parties and forgets about Tony. Her life is one continual round of dancing and drinking. One night she is taunting Evan (Wood), an easy-going sweetheart, and are then are giving away in a moment of passion brought on by the madness of dancing and Champaign. When Tony's uncle, he inherits his wealth and title, so he returns to London to claim Una. Una's aunt persuades her to keep her secrets, and Una prepares for the wedding. When Tony tells her of how he has remained true to her, she becomes near-hysterical as she realizes what her folly has led to. While the wedding crowd waiting at the church, she realizes she cannot go through with it. Una confesses her transgression to Tony and he forgives her, but she has taken poison and dies. Tony finally wanders back to his old place in Argentina and finds solace in marrying Maxine.

Cast

Preservation
Prints of The Dancers are in the collections of the Museum of Modern Art and George Eastman Museum, and the film has been released on dvd.

References

Bibliography
 Matthew Kennedy. Edmund Goulding's Dark Victory: Hollywood's Genius Bad Boy. Terrace Books, 2004.

External links

1925 films
1925 drama films
Silent American drama films
Films directed by Emmett J. Flynn
American silent feature films
1920s English-language films
Fox Film films
Films set in London
Films set in South America
American films based on plays
American black-and-white films
1920s dance films
1920s American films